Alexander Hutchinson (born 4 October 1908, date of death unknown) was a Scottish professional footballer who played as an outside left (winger).

After starting his career in Scotland with  Bo'ness, Hutchinson moved to England to join Burnley in October 1929. After five league games and two goals, he joined the Clarets' Lancashire neighbours Blackpool the following season, 1930–31. He made his debut for the Tangerines on 1 November 1930, in a 3–0 defeat at Chelsea. He appeared in the following five league games, scoring twice. His first goal came in a 2–2 draw against Aston Villa at Bloomfield Road on 22 November; the second a fortnight later, a 3–1 reversal at West Ham on 6 December.

Blackpool did not retain his services at the end of the campaign, at which point he left and returned to Bo'ness, then had short spells with Leith Athletic, Hibernian and King's Park.

He finished his career with Cardiff City in 1934, making 23 league appearances and scoring four goals for the Bluebirds.

References

1908 births
Sportspeople from Musselburgh
Scottish footballers
Association football outside forwards
Burnley F.C. players
Blackpool F.C. players
Bo'ness F.C. players
Cardiff City F.C. players
Hibernian F.C. players
Leith Athletic F.C. players
King's Park F.C. players
English Football League players
Scottish Football League players
Year of death missing
Footballers from East Lothian